Brooklyn Northern United A.F.C is an association football club in Wellington, New Zealand. 

Commonly referred to as 'BNU', the club is an amalgamation of Northern, formed by members of Wellington's Chinese community in 1949, and Brooklyn United, founded as Institute Old Boys in 1916. The amalgamation of Northern and Brooklyn combined Northern’s strength, with the area identification Brooklyn enjoyed.

In 2004 Brooklyn Northern United became an Associate Member Club of Team Wellington who play in the ASB Premiership.

Club history

Coaching staff

External links

The Ultimate New Zealand Soccer Website
BNU is a Team Wellington Associate Member Club

Association football clubs in Wellington
Sport in Wellington City
1916 establishments in New Zealand